The 18th Vermont Infantry Regiment was an infantry regiment from Vermont that failed to complete its organization to serve in the Union Army during the American Civil War.

References

Bibliography 
 Dyer, Frederick H. (1959). A Compendium of the War of the Rebellion. New York and London. Thomas Yoseloff, Publisher. .

Units and formations of the Union Army from Vermont
1865 establishments in Vermont
Military units and formations established in 1865
Military units and formations disestablished in 1865